Pali is a West Chadic language of Nigeria. It was reported by Rudolf Leger.

References 

West Chadic languages